Spider-Woman was a comic book limited series written by Brian Michael Bendis, drawn by Alex Maleev, published by Marvel Comics in 2009–2010, starring Spider-Woman. It is the fourth Marvel Comics series released under the title Spider-Woman.

The series was released simultaneously in printed comic book and motion comic forms, making it the first original motion comic released by a major publisher.  The series ended at issue #7.

Storyline
Jessica Drew, a.k.a. Spider-Woman, is recruited by S.W.O.R.D., an agency that specializes in eliminating alien threats to Earth.

Plot synopsis
The story is set shortly after the events of Marvel's Secret Invasion story line. Therein, the Skrulls infiltrated the Earth, replacing A-list super heroes with their own shape-shifting operatives. Jessica Drew, aka Spider-Woman, was replaced by the Skrull queen Veranke. The series starts with Jessica feeling very poorly about her life due to Veranke's actions. She is approached to join S.W.O.R.D. by agent Abigail Brand, which she accepts. Her first mission takes her to Madripoor where she takes on a Skrull posing as Spider-Man. After run-ins with HYDRA, another Skrull and the new Thunderbolts, Jessica takes down a wayward Skrull with the help of her teammates in the New Avengers. After the mission is over, Brand offers her new opportunities within S.W.O.R.D.

References

External links
Spider-Woman at Hulu
Spider-Woman at Rucomics.info
Marvel Motion Comics
Comic Book DB

Superhero comics
Spider-Woman
Comics by Brian Michael Bendis